Alexander Malta (28 September 1938 as Alexander Lagger – 23 August 2016) was a Swiss operatic bass-baritone

Life 
Engaged in Munich, he performed in Cologne, Berlin, Vienna, Zurich, Geneva, Milan and Florence, where he sang Landgrave (Tannhäuser) in 1983. He made his American debut in San Francisco in 1976, then appeared in Chicago and Philadelphia in 1985.

He was Peter Lagger's younger brother and married the American coloratura soprano Janet Perry.

References

External links 
 
 

Pseudonyms
20th-century Swiss male opera singers
Bass-baritones
1938 births
2016 deaths
People from the canton of St. Gallen